Ann Emelinda Skinn (née Masterman; 17471789) was an English novelist.

Ann Masterman was born in 1747, most likely in York as she states on the title page of her work, The Old Maid, that York is her "native place."  Masterman died in poverty on 23 March 1789 in Margate, Kent, at the age of 41.

She is the author of only one known work, The Old Maid, published in 1771.

Bibliography 

The old maid; or, history of Miss Ravensworth. In a series of letters. By Mrs. Skinn, Late Miss Masterman, of York. In three volumes. Printed for J. Bell at his Circulating-Library, near Exeter-Exchange, in the Strand; and C. Etherington, at York, 1771.

References 

1747 births
1789 deaths
English novelists
English women writers
18th-century English writers
18th-century British women writers
18th-century English women
18th-century English people